Switched! (Simplified Chinese: 幸运星) is a Singaporean Chinese-language drama television series, starring Fann Wong and Jeanette Aw which was broadcast on Singapore's free-to-air channel, MediaCorp TV Channel 8 from June 26, 2007 to July 23, 2007. It is screened on every weekday night, 9pm. This series consists of 20 episodes.

Cast

Main cast

Supporting cast

Synopsis
Jiang Pei Xiang is a TCM practitioner who runs a clinic with his wife and assistant Wang An Xiang. The oldest child Xin Yu has a scar and suffers from an inferiority complex as a result. Hence she has been unable to find a boyfriend at age 28. Xin Hui is an actress and enjoys the high life and much attention from potential suitors but has yet to find her "true love". Zhi Heng is the youngest and as the only son, his father has higher expectations of him, which only causes friction between them.

One day a genie swaps Xin Yu and Xin Hui's souls. They must now learn to cope with the other's situation.

Viewership ratings

References

External links
Official Website

Singapore Chinese dramas
2007 Singaporean television series debuts
Channel 8 (Singapore) original programming